Kristeen Young (born 1975) is an American singer-songwriter and pianist. Originally from St. Louis, Missouri, Young began playing piano as a child. She has released seven studio albums. Young has also sung with several artists including David Bowie, Morrissey, Brian Molko of Placebo and The Damned. She also recorded with record producer Tony Visconti, drummer Dave Grohl, and guitarist Nick Zinner.

Career
In 1997, she released her debut album Meet Miss Young and Her All Boy Band. In the early 2000s, she began working with Tony Visconti on Breasticles, which featured a duet with David Bowie, "Saviour". On 2004's  X, the opening track "No Other God" was a duet with Brian Molko of Placebo.

Besides her own work, Young has also been featured on other artists' records. She appeared on David Bowie's Heathen in 2002. She also provided the operatic vocals in Morrissey's single "That's How People Grow Up" in 2008. She then sang vocals on an alternate version of "New Kid" by Monokino in 2009, and collaborated with GUIDES to perform a cover of "Leave Me Alone" by New Order in 2015.

In May 2014, Young released her seventh album, The Knife Shift, which was recorded with Dave Grohl who played drums and guitar.

In 2019, Young released her tenth studio album, The SubSet, which she wrote, arranged, produced, and mixed. The album was rated 8 out of 10 by Pop Matters.

Discography

Studio albums
Meet Miss Young and Her All Boy Band (1997)
Enemy (1999)
Breasticles (2003)
X (2004)
The Orphans (2006)
Music for Strippers, Hookers, and the Odd On-Looker (2009)
V the Volcanic (2011)
The Knife Shift (2014)
Live At the Witch's Tit (2017)
The Subset (2019)
Beauty Shop (2022)

Singles
"Saviour" ft. David Bowie (Kro/Sony Masterworks 2020 — originally released on Breasticles, 2003)
"Touch Tongues" (N- 2003, Portugal)
"Kill the Father" (Sanctuary/Attack 2006, UK)
"London Cry" (Sanctuary/Attack 2006, UK)
"Pearl of a Girl" (Digital Release Only, TVPI 2014, US)

EP
V the Volcanic (2011)

References

External links

20th-century American musicians
20th-century American singers
21st-century American musicians
21st-century American singers
Living people
Singers with a four-octave vocal range
Musicians from St. Louis
Singers from Missouri
20th-century American women singers
21st-century American women singers
Sanctuary Records artists
1975 births